Ephyriades arcas, the Caribbean duskywing, is a butterfly of the family Hesperiidae. It is found in Central America and the Caribbean, the type specimen being described from Saint Kitts.

Description
Upper side: Thorax and abdomen black. Wings very dark brownish black, immaculate. Margins entire. Under side: Legs, breast, and abdomen dark brown, but rather lighter than on the upper side, immaculate, except a small white spot on the anterior, placed near the anterior edge towards the tip.

Subspecies
Ephyriades arcas arcas
Ephyriades arcas philemon (Fabricius, 1775) (Cuba, Bahamas)

References

Erynnini
Butterflies of Central America
Butterflies of the Caribbean
Descriptions from Illustrations of Exotic Entomology
Butterflies described in 1773
Taxa named by Dru Drury